The Imperials Football Club was an Australian rules football club based in Fremantle, Western Australia. Formed in 1892, the club competed in the West Australian Junior Football Association for three seasons from 1892 to 1894, and was admitted to the senior West Australian Football Association in 1895.

History
The club is first mentioned in the fixtures for the 1892 junior football season, but it may have been formed before then. The last published premiership tables, produced in The West Australian on 27 September 1892, had Imperials first on 14 points, having won seven and lost one of their eight games. Imperials were admitted into the senior competition, the West Australian Football Association (WAFA), for the 1895 season. The club disbanded at the end of the 1897 season, finishing with the success rate of 41.7%.

Foundation of East Fremantle 
The club disbanded at the conclusion of the 1897 season, with many of its players and administrators forming the bulk of the East Fremantle Football Club, which was established the next season. A number of the club's players played with the newly formed , which was established before the 1898 season. Notable players included David Christy, Wally Watts, Tommy O'Dea, and Tom Wilson.

References

Former West Australian Football League clubs
Australian rules football clubs established in 1892
Australian rules football clubs disestablished in 1897
Australian rules football clubs in Western Australia
1892 establishments in Australia
1897 disestablishments in Australia